The Yan River is a river in Shaanxi, China. The river flows from its source, the Xingzi River in Jingbian County, in the prefecture-level city Yulin, and then flows through neighboring Yan'an, finally flowing into the larger Yellow River in Yanchang County, Yan'an.

Geography 
The Yan River's source is Zhou Mountain, in the town of  Jingbian County, Yulin. The river then flows to the south into Yan'an, entering by passing through Ansai District.

The Yan River continues its flow south to Baota District, the urban center of Yan'an. In Baota District, the river passes through , Qiaogou Subdistrict, Liqu, and finally, .

From Baota District, the river flows east through Yanchang County, where it merges into the larger Yellow River.

Characteristics 
The Yan River is highly seasonal, due to the large disparities in the region's wet season and dry season. There is little year-round water flow contributing to the river.

The Yan River's basin follows a gradient of higher elevations in the northwest, and lower elevations in the southeast, resulting in the river's flow in that direction. Due to the geology of the Loess Plateau, the Yan River often follows a highly curvy path, and has a high sand content. Landslides are common in the Yan River's basin. 34% of the basin is covered in forest.

The average sediment transport volume is 16 million tons.

History 
Throughout China's long history, the Yan River has been called a number of different names. During the Warring States period, the river was known as the Qushui. Later, during the Western Han, the river was called the Weishui. Afterwards, in the Northern and Southern dynasties, and during the Western Wei, the river was known as the Qingshui. During various points after the Western Wei, the river was called a number of other names, including the Jinshui and the Zhuojinshui. The current name, the Yan River, is only a more recent name for the river.

Tributaries 

Tributaries along the Yan River's left bank include the Fengfu River, the Panlong River, and the Wuyang River. Tributaries along the river's right bank include the Xi River, the Nan River, and the Masi River.

References 

Rivers of Shaanxi
Yan'an
Yulin, Shaanxi